Victoria and Her Hussar (German: Viktoria und ihr Husar) is a 1931 German musical film directed by Richard Oswald and starring Michael Bohnen, Friedel Schuster and Iván Petrovich. It is an Operetta film based on the operetta Viktoria und ihr Husar by Paul Abraham which was itself inspired by a work by Emric Földes. Two later film versions of the operetta were made in 1954 and 1982.

It was shot at the Tempelhof Studios in Berlin. The film's sets were designed by the art director Franz Schroedter.

Synopsis
A Hungarian Countess believes that her husband, a hussar officer in the Austro-Hungarian army, has been killed in the First World War. She becomes engaged to an American diplomat, only for her first husband to turn up still alive.

Cast

References

Bibliography
 Höbusch, Harald. "Mountain of Destiny": Nanga Parbat and Its Path Into the German Imagination. Boydell & Brewer, 2016.
 Traubner, Richard. Operetta: A Theatrical History. Routledge, 2003.

External links

1931 films
Films of the Weimar Republic
1930s German-language films
Films directed by Richard Oswald
1931 musical films
German musical films
Films based on operettas
Operetta films
Films set in Hungary
Films set in Russia
Films set in China
Films set in the 1910s
Films set in the 1920s
World War I prisoner of war films
German black-and-white films
Films scored by Paul Abraham
Films shot at Tempelhof Studios
1930s German films